Bjarmian languages are a group of extinct Finnic languages once spoken in Bjarmia, or the northern part of the Dvina basin. Vocabulary of the languages in Bjarmia can be reconstructed from toponyms in the Arkhangelsk region, and a few words are documented by Norse travelers. Also some Saamic toponyms can also be found in the Dvina basin.

Affinities 
There were likely many Finnic languages spoken in Bjarmia, the first one was an archaic Finnic language with the diphthong *ai instead of Finnic ei, lack of consonant gradation and the vowel /ɤ/.

Later a Karelian-like language started to be spoken in Bjarmia, which did not have the Karelian sound shift of /aa/ into /ua/. Some toponyms in Bjarmia also have the sound /ʃ/ instead of /s/.

Janne Saarikivi suggests that some Saamic languages were spoken in Bjarmia alongside Finnic languages.

Reconstructions 
Many toponyms in the Arkhangelsk oblast are of Finno–Ugric origin, together with the Vologda oblast, according to Matveev, there are up to 100,000 toponyms of Finno–Ugric origin.

Legacy 
Some Finnic substrate words can be found in Northern Russian dialects, for example the words: лахта (lahta) 'marsh, moist place, meadow',  луда (luda) 'rocky islet', каска (kaska) ‘young woods’ and щелья (schelja) ‘hill or steep bank by a river’. Such words can be found in the Russian dialects around Pinega. Their source is Finnic languages.

Gandvík is a name associated with Bjarmia that appears in Norse poems. The word could have been a Norse translation of a Finnic word, which is "Kantalahti" in Finnish. The word Vína appears in many Norse sagas that refer to Bjarmia; it is likely related to the Finnish word "Vienanmeri" (White Sea). Norse sagas also documented a Bjarmian word "Jómali", which is likely related to Finnish "Jumala" 'God'.

See also 
Pomor dialects
Karelian language

References

Further reading
 Helimski, Eugene, "The "Northwestern" Group of Finno-Ugric Languages and its Heritage in the Place Names and Substratum Vocabulary of the Russian North", in Juhani Nuorluoto (ed.), Slavica Helsingiensia 27: The Slavicization of the Russian North. Mechanisms and Chronology. Helsinki. 2006.
 Jackson, Tatjana N., "Bjarmaland Revisited", in Acta Borealia 00-2002. 2002. A survey of Western and Russian Literature on Bjarmaland. 
 Ross, Alan S. C., Terfinnas and Beormas. London: Viking Society for Northern Research. 1981. Reprint of 1940 Edition.
 Saarikivi, Janne, "The Divergence of Proto-Uralic and its Offspring: A Descendent Reconstruction", in (eds.) Bakro-Nagy et al, The Oxford Guide to the Uralic Languages. OUP. 2022.

Extinct languages of Europe
Uralic languages